Egyptian coup d'état may refer to:

Egyptian Revolution of 1952
2013 Egyptian coup d'état